The Baader Meinhof Complex is a 2008 German drama film directed by Uli Edel. Written and produced by Bernd Eichinger, it stars Moritz Bleibtreu, Martina Gedeck, and Johanna Wokalek. The film is based on the 1985 German best selling non-fiction book of the same name by Stefan Aust. It retells the story of the early years of the West German far-left terrorist organisation the Rote Armee Fraktion (Red Army Fraction, or Red Army Faction, a.k.a. RAF) from 1967 to 1977.

The film was nominated for Best Foreign Language Film at the 81st Academy Awards. It was also nominated for Best Foreign Language Film at the 66th Golden Globe Awards.

Plot
On 2 June 1967, the Shah of Iran visits West Berlin and attends a performance at the Deutsche Oper. Angered at his policies in governing Iran, members of the West German student movement protest. The police and the Shah's security team attack the protesters, and unarmed protester Benno Ohnesorg is fatally shot by Officer Karl-Heinz Kurras.

Ohnesorg's death outrages West Germany, including left wing journalist Ulrike Meinhof, who claims in a televised debate that the democratically elected government of West Germany is a fascist police state. While covering their trial, Ulrike Meinhof finds herself deeply moved by their commitment to armed struggle against what they see as a Neo-Nazi Government. She secures a jailhouse interview with Ensslin and the two strike up a close friendship. Soon after, Meinhof leaves her husband for journalist Peter Homann, an associate of the radicals.

Meanwhile, Ensslin and Baader have been released pending an appeal and attract various young people, including Astrid Proll and Peter-Jurgen Boock. After spending some time abroad, Baader, Ensslin and Proll return to West Germany and begin living with Meinhof. Increasingly bored with her middle-class life, Meinhof longs to take more violent action. Even though Ensslin tells her that sacrifices must be made for the revolution, Meinhof does not wish to leave her children. But then, Baader is arrested. Using her connections, Meinhof arranges for him to be interviewed off prison grounds, where Ensslin and the others spring him from custody. While the plan called for Meinhof to look like an innocent journalist caught in a prison break, she flees with Baader and Ensslin, thereby incriminating herself in the attempted murders of an unarmed civilian and two policemen.

After leaving Meinhof's two children in Sicily, the group receives training in a Fatah camp in Jordan, where the egotistical and promiscuous Germans enrage their Muslim hosts. Homann leaves the group after overhearing Meinhof, Baader, and Ensslin asking Fatah to kill him. Having also learned that Meinhof wishes to send her two children to a training camp for suicide bombers, Homann informs Meinhof's former colleague Stefan Aust, who returns the children to their father.

Returning to Germany and styling themselves the Red Army Faction (RAF), Baader and his followers launch a campaign of bank robberies. In response, BKA chief Horst Herold orders all local police to be put at Federal command for one day. During that day, RAF member Petra Schelm drives through a roadblock and is chased by two cops. When cornered, she initiates a gunfight and is fatally shot by their return fire. Regarding this as murder, Baader and Ensslin overrule Meinhof's objections and begin systematically bombing police stations and United States Military bases. As grisly footage of the maimed and the dead appears onscreen, Meinhof's press statements rationalizing the bombings are heard in voiceover.

As things escalate, Herold orders the BKA to pioneer criminal profiling and RAF members begin to be arrested. Baader and Holger Meins are caught after a shoot-out with police. Ensslin and Meinhof are captured soon after. In separate prisons, the RAF inmates stage a hunger strike which results in Meins' death. The German student movement considers this to be murder. The authorities then move Baader, Ensslin, Meinhof, and Jan-Carl Raspe to Stammheim Prison, where they work on their defense for their trial and smuggle orders outside.

In 1975, a group of younger RAF recruits seize the West German embassy in Stockholm where they murder two hostages. The siege ends with an explosion which injures all the terrorists and hostages. RAF member Ulrich Wessel dies two hours later in a local hospital while Siegfried Hausner is critically wounded, extradited to West Germany and dies in a prison hospital. The imprisoned RAF members are appalled by the poor execution of their orders. Meanwhile, Herold's assistant asks why people who have never met Baader are willing to take orders from him. Herold replies, "A myth."

Meinhof, suffering from depression and remorse over the deaths caused by their bombings, is subjected to sadistic emotional abuse by Baader and Ensslin, who call her a traitor and "a knife in the RAF's back". In response, Meinhof hangs herself in her cell. The imprisoned RAF members accuse West Germany's Government of murdering her during their trial and are widely believed.

Upon completing her sentence, Brigitte Mohnhaupt takes over command of the RAF. She informs Boock that Baader has forbidden any more attacks on "the people" and enlists his help smuggling weapons into Stammheim. In retaliation for the "murders" of Meins, Hausner, and Meinhof, the RAF assassinates West Germany's Attorney General, Siegfried Buback. Mohnhaupt, Christian Klar, and Susanne Albrecht, also attempt to kidnap Dresdner Bank President Jürgen Ponto, who fights back and is shot dead. Knowing that the imprisoned RAF members have ordered both murders, the West German Government returns them to solitary confinement. Even so, Ensslin and Baader obtain two-way radios and continue smuggling orders outside.

Mohnhaupt then abducts industrialist Hanns-Martin Schleyer and demands the release of her imprisoned comrades in exchange for not killing him. When West German authorities fail to meet their demands, the RAF and the Popular Front for the Liberation of Palestine hijack Lufthansa Flight 181. The hijacking ends with the plane being stormed and the hostages saved. In Stammheim, Baader warns a West German Government negotiator that the violence will continue to escalate. Ensslin makes the same prediction to the prison chaplain and claims that the West German Government is about to murder her and her imprisoned comrades.

The following morning, corrections officers find Baader and Raspe shot to death in their cells as the handguns Mohnhaupt smuggled into the prison lie nearby. Ensslin is found hanging from the steel bars of the window. They also find Irmgard Möller stabbed four times in the chest, but still alive. When the news reaches the free RAF members, they are devastated and certain that the trio was murdered. To their shock, Mohnhaupt explains that Baader, Ensslin, Möller, and Raspe "are not victims and never were". She explains that they, like Meinhof, were "in control of the outcome until the very end". When the RAF members react with stunned disbelief, Mohnhaupt responds, "You did not know them. Stop thinking that they were different than they were."

In a sign that RAF terrorism will continue, the last moments of the film show the murder of hostage Hanns-Martin Schleyer. In an ironic commentary on the violence of the era, Bob Dylan's "Blowin' in the Wind" plays during the credits.

Cast

Production
The film began production in August 2007 with filming at several locations including Berlin, Munich, Stammheim Prison, Rome and Morocco. The film was subsidized by several film financing boards to the sum of EUR 6.5 million.

The American trailer is narrated by actor Will Lyman, a voice commonly associated with serious documentary films.

Distribution and reception

The film premiered on 15 September 2008, in Munich and was commercially released in Germany on 25 September 2008. The film was chosen as Germany's official submission to the 81st Academy Awards for Best Foreign Language Film.

The Baader Meinhof Complex  has an approval rating of 85% on review aggregator website Rotten Tomatoes, based on 100 reviews, and an average rating of 7.04/10. The website's critical consensus states, "Intricately researched and impressively authentic slice of modern German History, with a terrific cast, assured direction, and a cracking script". Metacritic assigned the film a weighted average score of 76 out of 100, based on 22 critics, indicating "generally favorable reviews".

The Hollywood Reporter gave the film a favourable review, praising the acting and storytelling, but also noting a lack of character development in certain parts. A mixed review with similar criticism was published in Variety. Fionnuala Halligan of Screen International praised the film's excellent production values as well as the efficient and crisp translation of a fascinating topic to film, but felt that the plot flatlines emotionally and does not hold much dramatic suspense for younger and non-European audiences unfamiliar with the film's historical events.

Stanley Kauffmann of The New Republic wrote The Baader Meinhof Complex was 'A dynamic and fascinating account of the German terrorists of the 1970s'.

Anglo-American author and journalist Christopher Hitchens lavishly praised The Baader-Meinhof Complex in a review for Vanity Fair. He singled out what he considered "the filmmakers' decision to strike against Hollywood's usual practice of glamorizing Marxist insurgents" by making an explicit connection between revolutionary and criminal violence. By slowly erasing the difference between the two, Hitchens wrote that the film exposed the "uneasy relationship between sexuality and cruelty, and between casual or cynical attitudes to both," as well as the 
RAF's tendency to offer unquestioning support to the most extreme factions of the Marxist and Islamist underground. Relating his own memories of West Germany during the era, Hitchens further described the RAF as "a form of psychosis" that swept through the former Axis powers of Germany, Japan, and Italy a generation after the end of the Second World War. Comparing the RAF to the Japanese Red Army and the Italian Red Brigades, Hitchens wrote, "The propaganda of the terrorists showed an almost neurotic need to 'resist authority' in a way that their parents' generation had so terribly failed to do." In conclusion, Hitchens praised the film's depiction of an escalating cycle of violence and paranoia in "which mania feeds upon itself and becomes hysterical."

Film and Red Army Faction historian Christina Gerhardt wrote a more critical review for Film Quarterly. Arguing that its nonstop action failed to engage the historical and political events depicted, she wrote "During its 150 minutes, the film achieves action-film momentum—bombs exploding, bullets spraying, and glass shattering—and this inevitably comes at the expense of quasi journalistic exposé or historical excavation."

French movie director Olivier Assayas, who had previously made a film about left-wing terrorist Carlos the Jackal, wrote that the film addresses a very painful subject for modern Germany and called it, "some kind of revolution." He admitted, however, that his own perspective was limited: "I’m not German and I’m not an expert, but I never really bought the collective suicide theory. For me it’s absolutely impossible to believe. So I don’t think The Baader Meinhof Complex fully addresses the issue. The supposed suicides in Stammheim prison are for me the elephant in the living room of German politics dealing with that subject. You have to take a position on the subject and face it. The Baader Meinhof Complex doesn’t exactly face it."

The Filmbewertungsstelle Wiesbaden, Germany's national agency which evaluates movies on their artistic, documentary and historical significance, gave the movie the rating "especially valuable." In their explanatory statement the committee says: "the film tries to do justice to the terrorists as well as to the representatives of the German state by describing both sides with an equally objective distance." The committee summarized the film as: "German history as a big movie production: impressive, authentic, political, tantalizing."

Reception from the families of those killed by the RAF  
Prior to seeing the film, Michael Buback, the son of West German Attorney General Siegfried Buback, expressed doubts that the film would seriously attempt to present the historical truth. He later amended this statement after seeing the film, but expressed regret that The Baader-Meinhof Complex concentrates almost exclusively on members of the RAF, which carried the danger that viewers would identify too strongly with the protagonists.

As a protest against the "distorted" and "almost completely false" portrayal of the RAF's assassination of banker Jürgen Ponto, Ignes Ponto, his widow and witness, returned her Federal Cross of Merit. She further accused the German government, which co-produced the film through various film financing funds, as jointly responsible for the "public humiliations" suffered by the Ponto family. Jürgen Ponto's daughter Corinna, also made a statement calling the film's violation of her family's privacy "wrong" and "particularly perfidious."

Jörg Schleyer, the son of murdered Confederation of German Employers' Associations President Hanns Martin Schleyer, praised the film. In an interview with Der Spiegel, Schleyer expressed a belief that The Baader-Meinhof Complex accurately portrays the RAF, for the first time in a German film, as, "a ruthless and merciless gang of murderers." Commenting on the film's graphic violence, he said, "Only a movie like this can show young people how brutal and bloodthirsty the RAF's actions were at that time."

Extended version
The German TV channel ARD aired the film split in two parts with new footage added to each part. This extended version was later released in Germany on DVD as well. The first part adds ten minutes and 41 seconds of new footage, the second part 3 minutes and 41 seconds.

References

Bibliography
  (English translation The Baader-Meinhof Complex published 2008 by The Bodley Head)

External links
  (US)
 
 
 
 
 
 Tragedy, Terrorism, and Glamor: A Review of The Baader Meinhof Complex

2008 films
2008 biographical drama films
2000s political thriller films
Biographical films about people convicted on terrorism charges
German biographical drama films
French biographical drama films
Czech biographical drama films
2000s German-language films
Films directed by Uli Edel
Films based on non-fiction books
Films set in Berlin
Films set in France
Films set in West Germany
Films set in Jordan
Films set in Iraq
Films set in Italy
Films set in Sweden
Films set in the 1960s
Films set in the 1970s
Films shot in Berlin
Films shot in Germany
Films shot in Italy
Films shot in Morocco
Cultural depictions of the Red Army Faction
Terrorism in Germany
Films produced by Bernd Eichinger
Films with screenplays by Bernd Eichinger
2008 drama films
2000s French films
2000s German films